Andrea Vuerich (6 October 1907 – 23 April 1964) was an Italian cross-country skier. He competed at the 1932 Winter Olympics and the 1936 Winter Olympics.

References

External links
 

1907 births
1964 deaths
Italian male cross-country skiers
Italian male Nordic combined skiers
Olympic cross-country skiers of Italy
Olympic Nordic combined skiers of Italy
Cross-country skiers at the 1932 Winter Olympics
Nordic combined skiers at the 1936 Winter Olympics
People from Pontebba
Sportspeople from Friuli-Venezia Giulia